Maria Beling (1915-1994) was a German soprano and film actress.

Selected filmography
 The Black Forest Girl (1933)
 Bashful Felix (1934)
 Paganini (1934)
 The Voice of Love (1934)
 A Woman Who Knows What She Wants (1934)
 Verlieb' dich nicht am Bodensee (1935)

References

Bibliography
 Waldman, Harry. Nazi Films in America, 1933-1942. McFarland, 2008.

External links

1915 births
1994 deaths
German film actresses
Actors from Mannheim
20th-century German women singers
Musicians from Mannheim